The Sixties is a documentary miniseries which premiered on CNN on May 29, 2014. Produced by Tom Hanks and Gary Goetzman's studio Playtone, the 10-part series chronicled events and popular culture of the United States during the 1960s.

The premiere of The Sixties was a ratings success for CNN; it was seen by 1.39 million total viewers, finishing in between Fox News Channel and MSNBC in total viewership, and beating its rivals in key demographic audience share. CNN has since commissioned follow-ups covering later decades, including The Seventies (2015), The Eighties (2016), The Nineties (2017), The 2000s (2018), and The 2010s (2023). In 2018, Playtone, which recounted the events of 1968 as episode 8 in this series, revisited the year in more detail in the four-part series 1968: The Year That Changed America.

Episodes

Production

Development
In 2013, CNN president Jeff Zucker came up with the concept of The Sixties from conversations about "the forthcoming anniversary of JFK’s assassination, The Beatles, and the civil rights movement". Inspiration for the series also came to Zucker after being impressed with the National Geographic historical television film Killing Lincoln, which included Mark Herzog as one of the executive producers. Upon the announcement of the series by Variety on September 17, 2013, Vinnie Malhotra, senior vice president of development and acquisition in CNN, stated that they were "looking at [The Sixties] as a major television event." With the inception of the project coming within a year of Zucker's appointment as president of CNN, Zucker also stated to Variety that "Projects like this are emblematic of exactly the type of programming that we need more of, signifying a new direction and expanded sensibility at CNN."

Release
Although The Sixties premiered in May 2014, the third episode, "The Assassination of President Kennedy", was previously released as its own television special on November 14, 2013, to coincide with the 50th anniversary of John F. Kennedy's assassination.

References

External links

Television series set in the 1960s
2010s American documentary television series
2014 American television series debuts
2014 American television series endings
CNN original programming
Documentary television series about the Cold War
Television series about the history of the United States
Television series by Playtone